The National Salvation Junta was a group of military officers designated to maintain the government of Portugal in April 1974 after the Carnation Revolution had overthrown the Estado Novo dictatorial regime. This junta assumed power following a communiqué of its president, António de Spínola, at 1:30 a.m. on 26 April 1974. The National Salvation Junta was the de jure governing body of Portugal following the Carnation Revolution.

Purpose
The Junta was a pre-planned part of the national reform program envisioned by the Movimento das Forças Armadas (Movement of the Armed Forces; MFA), which aimed to exercise political power after the revolution and prior to the formation of a civilian government in order to prevent the collapse of the Presidency of the Republic (then held by Rear-Admiral Américo Tomás) and of the government. It entailed the dissolution of the National Assembly and of the Council of State. The Constitutional Law 1/74 of 25 April 1974 was promulgated in order to set this process in motion. The Junta assumed upon itself the power to choose the President and Vice-President.

On an interim basis, the Junta also exercised the functions of the Presidency of the Republic (from 26 April to 15 May, when it designated as Head of State the president of the Junta, António de Spínola) and of President of the Council (from 26 April to 16 May, when the MFA-chosen First Provisional Government of Portugal took power, headed by Adelino da Palma Carlos).

Members

The Junta was composed of:
 General António Ribeiro de Spínola (President),
 General Francisco da Costa Gomes (Army),
 Brigadier Jaime Silvério Marques (Army),
 General Diogo Neto (Air Force - absent in Portuguese Mozambique),
 Colonel Carlos Galvão de Melo (Air Force),
 Naval Captain José Baptista Pinheiro de Azevedo (Navy),
 Naval Commander António Alva Rosa Coutinho (Navy).

On 30 September 1974 the staff was reorganized:
 General Francisco da Costa Gomes (president, Army),
 Lieutenant Colonel Carlos Alberto Idães Soares Fabião (former governor of Portuguese Guinea, Army).
 Lieutenant-Colonel Nuno Fisher Lopes Pires (Army).
 Vice-Admiral José Pinheiro de Azevedo (Navy).
 Naval Captain Silvano Alves Ribeiro (Navy), during the absence of Naval Commander António Rosa Coutinho, who was appointed the governor of Portuguese Angola.
 Lieutenant-Colonel Narciso Mendes Dias (Air Force),
 Lieutenant-Colonel Aníbal Pinho Freire (Air Force).

Abolition 
Constitutional Law 5/75 of 14 March 1975 abolished the National Salvation Junta and established the Revolutionary Council of Portugal (Conselho da Revolução de Portugal), which included former members of the Junta.

Carnation Revolution
1974 in Portugal
1975 in Portugal
Military history of Portugal
Political history of Portugal
Presidents of Portugal
Prime Ministers of Portugal
1974 establishments in Portugal
1975 disestablishments in Portugal
1970s in Portugal
Provisional governments